Vladimir Shishkin (Russian: Владимир Шишкин; born 12 January 1964) is a retired Russian athlete who specialised in the sprint hurdles. He competed at two Olympic Games as well as two World Championships. His best placings were fourth at the 1988 Olympics and sixth at the 1991 World Championships.

His personal bests are 13.21 seconds in the 110 metres hurdles (+1.8 m/s, Leningrad 1988) and 7.57 seconds in the 60 metres hurdles (Ghent 1990).

International competitions

References

1964 births
Living people
Russian male hurdlers
Soviet male hurdlers
Sportspeople from Nizhny Novgorod
Athletes (track and field) at the 1988 Summer Olympics
Athletes (track and field) at the 1992 Summer Olympics
Olympic athletes of the Soviet Union
Olympic athletes of the Unified Team
Soviet Athletics Championships winners
Competitors at the 1986 Goodwill Games